A friar is a term for a member of a religious order.  Friar or Friars may also refer to:

 The Friars (club), American student club
 The Friars (Tasmania), Tasmanian island group
 Aylesford Priory, Kent, England, also known as The Friars
 Providence Friars, Division I sports teams of Providence College
 Amauris, genus of nymphalid butterflies sometimes referred to as friars.

See also
San Diego Padres, baseball team sometimes referred to as the Friars
Friars Club (disambiguation)